Choi Kyu-baek (born 23 January 1994) is a South Korean footballer who plays as centre back for Kedah Darul Aman FC.

Career
Choi joined Jeonbuk Hyundai in January 2016. He made his professional debut in the Champions League game against Bình Dương on 15 March.

Choi was included in the final player list of Rio Olympic (South Korea U-23). He played 3 games against Fiji, Germany and Honduras.

On 14 December 2016, he was traded from Jeonbuk to Ulsan Hyundai FC with Kim Chang-soo and Lee Jong-ho.

References

External links

1994 births
Living people
Association football central defenders
South Korean footballers
South Korean expatriate footballers
Jeonbuk Hyundai Motors players
Ulsan Hyundai FC players
V-Varen Nagasaki players
Jeju United FC players
K League 1 players
Footballers at the 2016 Summer Olympics
Olympic footballers of South Korea
South Korea under-23 international footballers
South Korean expatriate sportspeople in Japan
Expatriate footballers in Japan
J1 League players